Lyakhavichy is a city in Brest Region, Belarus, and the administrative center of Lyakhavichy District

History
Known since the 15th century in the Grand Duchy of Lithuania as the center of the volost of the same name. At the beginning of the 16th century, it belonged to Albrecht Gashtol'd. After the death of his son Stanislav in 1542 the city passed to the widow of the latter, Barbara Radziwill, who in 1547 married the heir to the Polish throne, bringing to him the numerous possessions of the Gashtol'ds. On April 10, 1572, Sigismund II Augustus transferred the town to the castellan of Vilna, Jan Ieronimovich Chodkevich. His son, the hetman, the great Lithuanian Jan Karol Khodkevich, built there in place of a small wooden castle a new stone castle of bastion type according to the most modern European models of that time. The castle was repeatedly unsuccessfully besieged by Ukrainian Cossacks and insurgent peasants. In 1635, the castle and the city passed into the possession of Jan Stanislaw Sapieha.

During the Russo-Polish War of 1654–1667. troops of A. N. Trubetskoy in 1655 burned the city, but did not dare to besiege the castle. In 1660 the Russian voevod Ivan Andreevich Khovansky was unable to take the fortress.

During the Northern War in 1706, the castle, defended by the Cossacks, was handed over to the Swedes after a long siege and partially destroyed.

In 1760–1775, the city and the partly destroyed castle belonged to the Bishop of Vilnius Ignatius of Masala, and then by a decision of the diet (sejm) passed into the possession of the Polish-Lithuanian Commonwealth.

Lyakhovichi was part of the Novgrudok povet (county), and from 1791 to the Sloucheretsk povet. Since 1793, part of the Russian Empire, a township and the center of the volost of Slutsk district. In 1897 the population of Liakhovichi was 5,016 people.

In the years 1655–1760, the famous Belynich Icon of the Mother of God was in Lyakhovichi.

During the First World War it was near the front lines.  In 1918, occupied by the Germans, in 1919-1920 by the Poles. In the 1921–1939. it was part of Poland, a city in the Baranovichi povet (county).

Since 1939, part of the BSSR (Byelorussian SSR) and since January 15, 1940 the district center. In 1939 there were 5,100 inhabitants.

During World War II, Liakhavichi was under German occupation from 26 June 1941 to 5 July 1944. More than 3,000 Jewish inhabitants lived in the town, swelled by an influx of refugees fleeing from central and western Poland.
In November 1941, Jews were gathered in the central square, then taken and killed in a sandpit near the village of Lotva by an Einsatzgruppe. A new massacre took place in June 1942 when 300 Jews kept prisoners in a ghetto were killed in a place close to the previous one. That day, a revolt in the ghetto took place and several Jews managed to kill the german commander and join the partisans.

Personalities
 Alexander Mukdoyni (Kopel) (1878–1958) Polish-American theatre critic who wrote in Yiddish
 Sergiusz Piasecki (1901–1964) - Polish writer and soldier
 Rabbi Mordechai Yaffe of Lechovitch (1742 - 1810) - a disciple of R' Aharon of Karlin (I), and his successor, R. Shlomo of Karlin
 Rabbi Noach Malovitzky of Lechovitz (1774 -1832) - Son  and successor of R' Mordechai of Lechovitz.
 Nachman Shlomo Greenspan (1878–1961) - Rabbi and Talmud scholar
 Will Herberg (1906-1977) - Jewish-American intellectual
 Jakub Szynkiewicz (1884–1966) - first mufti of the newly independent Poland in 1925
 Yosef Tekoah (1925–1991) - Israeli diplomat and President of the Ben-Gurion University of the Negev
 Joseph Brody (1877-1937)- American Jewish composer and teacher to George Gershwin

References

Sources

External links
 Lyakhovichi Shtetl homepage
 

 
Cities in Belarus
Populated places in Brest Region
Slutsky Uyezd
Nowogródek Voivodeship (1919–1939)
Jewish Belarusian history
Holocaust locations in Belarus